The Max Launch Abort System (MLAS) was a proposed alternative to the Maxime Faget-invented "tractor" launch escape system (LES) that was planned for use by NASA for its Orion spacecraft in the event an Ares I malfunction during launch required an immediate abort.

Designed by NASA engineers and reported on the website NASASpaceFlight.com on December 6, 2007, the proposed MLAS used four existing Huntsville-built Thiokol solid-rocket motors (built in 1988) placed at 90° intervals within the Orion's bullet-shaped fairing. The fairing was originally designed to protect the Orion spacecraft from aerodynamic stresses during launch, and to provide an interface between the spacecraft's crew module with the LES.

The MLAS was designed with the aim of reducing the height of the Orion/Ares I stack while also reducing weight and center-of-gravity issues of a traditional LES.  The bullet-shaped MLAS was also expected to provide better aerodynamic qualities during the first two minutes of flight, reducing stresses when the vehicle encounters the "max Q" region of hypersonic flight.  The MLAS was also expected to simplify production, as existing hardware would be employed.

There are several drawbacks to MLAS.  First, the bullet-shaped protective cover would have to be modified and reinforced to allow for the use of the solid-rocket motors, something not needed with the LES, which bolts on top of the LIDS docking ring assembly.  Second, the necessity to fire multiple motors (LES uses one motor and multiple nozzles) simultaneously for an abort decreases the theoretical reliability of the launch abort system by introducing more failure modes.

Like the existing LES, the MLAS would provide protection to the Orion spacecraft crew during the first  minutes of flight, with the MLAS being jettisoned, along with the service module's fairing panels, after the solid-rocket first stage was jettisoned.  If implemented, the Orion/Ares I stack would have resembled the towerless Gemini-Titan stack used between 1965 and 1966, in which ejection seats were used as the primary form of escape for the astronauts who flew on the ten Gemini missions.

The MLAS concept was dropped with the transformation of the Crew Exploration Vehicle into the Orion Multi-Purpose Crew Vehicle, and the switch of the launch vehicle from Ares I (with its perennial underperformance) to the Delta IV Heavy or Space Launch System.

July 2009 test launch
A "pad abort" flight test of the Max Launch Abort System was performed at NASA's Wallops Flight Facility on July 8, 2009, at 10:26 UTC. A primary test goal was the successful separation of a mock crew capsule from the abort system.

The test vehicle was different from the actual proposed system in many ways. The main difference was that the four propulsion rockets were not located in the forward fairing, but in a boost skirt located at the bottom of the test vehicle. The rockets in the fairing were represented by geometric dummies. The propulsion thrust was not balanced between the rockets by a manifold system, contrary to what was foreseen with the actual system.

References

Further reading

External links

Human spaceflight
Ares (rocket family)
Spacecraft components
2009 in spaceflight
Articles containing video clips